Yoon Joo-hee (born February 21, 1985) is a South Korean actress. She is best known for starring in the multi-season medical/crime procedural cable TV series Quiz of God.

Filmography

Film

Television series

Music video appearances

Awards and nominations

References

External links

 Yoon Joo-hee Fan Cafe at Daum 
 
 
 

1985 births
Living people
South Korean television actresses
South Korean film actresses